Corgatha semipardata is a species of moth of the family Erebidae. It is found in Borneo and Peninsular Malaysia.

References

Moths described in 1862
Moths of Borneo
Boletobiinae